Hoseynabad-e Dam Dahaneh (also Romanized as Ḩoseynābād-e Dam Dahaneh; also known as Ḩoseynābād and Ḩoseynābād-e Dahaneh) is a village in Heruz Rural District, Kuhsaran District, Ravar County, Kerman Province, Iran. At the 2006 census, its population was 26, in 9 families.

References 

Populated places in Ravar County